Nancy Sherman (born 1951) is a distinguished university professor and professor of philosophy at Georgetown University. She was also the inaugural Distinguished Chair in Ethics at the United States Naval Academy. Sherman is the author of several books, and her views on military ethics have been influential.

Education and career
Sherman received a bachelor's in philosophy from Bryn Mawr College in 1973. She went on to receive a master's in philosophy from the University of Edinburgh in 1976, and her doctorate from Harvard University in 1982.

After receiving her doctorate, she accepted a position as assistant professor of philosophy at Yale University in 1982, where she was promoted to associate professor in 1988.  In 1989, she moved to Georgetown University, accepting a position of tenured associate professor, receiving a promotion to full professor in 1994. In 2001, she was elevated to university professor. Besides her regular appointments, Sherman also served as the inaugural Distinguished Chair of Ethics at the United States Naval Academy from 1997 to 1999, and has been an adjunct professor of law at the Georgetown University Law Center since 2004.  She has also been a faculty affiliate at the Kennedy Institute of Ethics at Georgetown since 1994 and spent a term as visiting professor of philosophy at Johns Hopkins University in 1995, and two terms as such at the University of Maryland in 1995 and 1996.

Sherman has served in a variety of posts in the American Philosophical Association as well as other professional organizations.  In 2005, she was also invited by the Assistant Secretary of Defense for Health Affairs to visit Guantanamo Bay detention center to witness the conditions detainees were being held in, and to provide ethical advice as to their continued treatment. She also acted as an observer to the Vice Chief of the Army's Suicide Review Board in 2011.

In 2022, she was elected a Fellow of the American Academy of Arts & Sciences.

Research areas
Sherman has conducted research in general ethics, the history of philosophy, and moral psychology. In recent years her research has been primarily focused on military ethics and related matters. She has worked and published extensively on such issues as post-traumatic stress disorder (PTSD), military suicide, and the honor, guilt, and shame associated with war. Sherman has written about how ancient theories of stoicism may be modified and helpfully applied to the modern world and the modern soldier. Her conclusions have been criticized on the basis that such applications may be actively counterproductive.

Sherman writes about courage and the use of emotions from a soldier's point of view in her book Stoic Warriors.  She asserts that soldiers returning home often receive insufficient care, leaving them ill-prepared for non-violent civilian life.  Following this, she considers post-traumatic stress disorder), comparing the dysfunctional anger shown by some soldiers after they come home from war to the anger that may be functional on the battlefield as a way of summoning courage. Though the relationship of anger to courage may be deemed controversial to stoic views of the perfect warrior, Sherman sees this as a relationship in displaying courage since soldiers must suppress their anger, fear, and other battlefield emotions, inducing a disorder that releases these emotions after a battle, in non-violent situations. Thus the process by which courage is summoned and displayed on the battlefield can lead directly to PTSD when they return home—a process that can be addressed effectively by proper care upon their return.

In her most recent book Stoic Wisdom, Sherman argues for a credible modern Stoicism based on ancient Greek and Roman texts. She makes the case that Stoicism is not a philosophy of acquiescence or retreat, but a practical philosophy of engagement in the world that requires cultivated emotions and a commitment to the common good. In her previous book Afterwar, Sherman explores questions of moral injury and healing in war. The moral dimensions of returning soldiers' psychological injuries—guilt, shame, feeling responsible for doing wrong or being wronged—are often ignored and elude conventional treatment.

Publications
Sherman has published a large number of peer-reviewed papers and has also authored six books.  Sherman's books include Stoic Wisdom: Ancient Lessons For Modern Resilience (Oxford 2021);Afterwar: Healing the Moral Wounds of Our Soldiers (Oxford 2015); The Untold War: Inside the Hearts, Minds, and Souls of our Soldiers  (W.W. Norton 2010); Stoic Warriors: The Ancient Philosophy Behind the Military Mind (Oxford 2005); Making A Necessity of Virtue: Aristotle and Kant on Virtue (Cambridge 1997); and The Fabric of Character: Aristotle's Theory of Virtue (Oxford 1989). She is the editor of Aristotle's Ethics: Critical Essays (Rowman&Littlefield 1999).

References

1951 births
Living people
American women philosophers
Harvard University alumni
Georgetown University Law Center faculty
Bryn Mawr College alumni
21st-century American women